is a passenger railway station located in the city of Miyoshi, Tokushima Prefecture, Japan. It is operated by JR Shikoku and has the station number "D23".

Lines

Layout
The station, which is unstaffed, consists of two opposed side platforms serving two tracks. A timber building connected to Platform 1 serves as a waiting room. A footbridge connects to Platform 2 across the tracks. Originally Platform 2 was an island platform with a third track on the other side but the track has now become a siding.

Adjacent stations

History
Minawa Station opened on 19 September 1931 as the terminus of the then Tokushima Main Line (now Tokushima Line). At this time the station was operated by Japanese Government Railways, later corporatised as Japanese National Railways (JNR). With the privatization of JNR on 1 April 1987, control of the station passed to JR Shikoku.

See also
 List of Railway Stations in Japan

Surrounding area
Tokushima Prefectural Road No. 268
Tokushima Prefectural Road No. 269 
Kurozo Marsh
+Miyoshi Bridge

See also
List of railway stations in Japan

References

External links

 JR Shikoku timetable

Railway stations in Tokushima Prefecture
Dosan Line
Stations of Shikoku Railway Company
Railway stations in Japan opened in 1931
Miyoshi, Tokushima